The 1930-31 season in Swedish football, starting August 1930 and ending July 1931:

Honours

Official titles

Competitions

Promotions, relegations and qualifications

Promotions

Relegations

Domestic results

Allsvenskan 1930–31

Division 2 Norra 1930–31

Division 2 Södra 1930–31

Division 2 promotion play-off 1930–31

National team results

 Sweden: 

 Sweden: 

 Sweden: 

 Sweden: 

 Sweden: 

 Sweden: 

 Sweden: 

 Sweden: 

 Sweden:

National team players in season 1930/31

Notes

References
Print

Online

 
Seasons in Swedish football